Mark Lyttle (born 16 June 1963) is an Irish sailor. He competed in the Laser event at the 1996 Summer Olympics.

References

External links
 

1963 births
Living people
Irish male sailors (sport)
Olympic sailors of Ireland
Sailors at the 1996 Summer Olympics – Laser
Sportspeople from Dublin (city)